Tomáš Jeleček (born 25 February 1992) is a Czech football player who currently plays for Slovácko. He has represented the Czech Republic at under-21 level and was in the Czech squad for the 2011 UEFA European Under-19 Football Championship, where he played all five of his country's matches, scoring twice.

References

External links
 

Czech footballers
Czech Republic youth international footballers
Czech Republic under-21 international footballers
Czech First League players
1992 births
Living people
1. FC Slovácko players

Association football defenders